OpenFeint was a social platform for mobile games for devices running on Android or iOS. It was developed by Aurora Feint, a company named after a video game by the same developers. 
The platform consisted of an SDK for use by games, allowing its various social networking features to be integrated into the game's functionality. OpenFeint was discontinued at the end of 2012.

History
OpenFeint was founded by Jason Citron, who later founded Discord. The first iteration of OpenFeint was launched on February 17, 2009.

Version 2.0 was released in June 2009, and marked the first time that the platform was free for developers to integrate into their own applications. Harris Tsim joined to help with engineering.

Version 2.1 was released on August 14, 2009, featuring "Social challenges", which allowed users to create tasks for themselves and their friends to attempt within games and notified users when new challenges were available. It also allowed users to add "Friends" and introduced a new user interface.

Version 2.4 was released on January 8, 2010, with a revamped layout and a standalone OpenFeint app. As of January 2010, there were over 900 applications in the iOS App Store that used OpenFeint, and there were over ten million users registered on the network.

On September 15, 2010, OpenFeint announced that it would be supporting Android. The9 invested $5 million in the platform, and in October, Intel Capital announced that it had invested $3 million, combining with DeNA's $6 million investment to bring total investments to $12 million.

In April 2011, Japanese company GREE, Inc. bought OpenFeint for US$104 million.

In 2011, OpenFeint was party to a class action suit with allegations including computer fraud, invasion of privacy, breach of contract, bad faith and seven other statutory violations. According to a news report "OpenFeint's business plan included accessing and disclosing personal information without authorization to mobile-device application developers, advertising networks and web-analytic vendors that market mobile applications". 

On November 16, 2012, GREE announced that it would be discontinuing the service on December 14, 2012, primarily in favor of its own similar platform.

Notable applications
The following is a list of some of the many applications that used or were integrated with OpenFeint:

 
 101-in-1 Games
 3D Rollercoaster Rush Arriving Bloons TD Mobile
 Birdstrike 
 Bomberman Touch 2: Volcano Party 
 Cytus 
 Fieldrunners 
 Fruit Ninja 
 Galaxy on Fire geoDefense geoDefense Swarm 
 geoSpark Hook Worlds Jet Car Stunts 
 Jetpack Joyride 
 Minigore 
 The Moron Test 
 Pocket God 
 Robot Unicorn Attack 
 Space Freight
 Super QuickHook
 Tiny Wings
 World of Goo

See also
Social discovery platform
 Similar social platforms include Scoreloop and Apple's Game Center.

References

External links
 

IOS software
2009 software
Android (operating system) software
Products and services discontinued in 2012